Cutting It Short (also released as Shortcuts) is a 1980 Czechoslovak comedy film directed by Jiří Menzel. It is based on the novel Postřižiny by Czech writer Bohumil Hrabal. The story is set in a brewery in a Czech small town.

The film is an evocation of the childhood memories of Bohumil Hrabal in his provincial town of Nymburk, dominated by the local brewery. The main actors of the film, uncle Pepin and Maryška, are based on real family members of Hrabal: Maryška on his mother and uncle Pepin on his real uncle, who came to stay two weeks in the town but remained for forty years. His spontaneous stories influenced a lot of Hrabal's literary work.

The film was entered into the main competition at the 38th edition of the Venice Film Festival.

According to the film critic and historian Peter Hames, Cutting It Short, which frequently quotes or refers to silent comedy, is one of the best post-Tati comedies.

Theodor Pištěk designed the costumes for the film.

Cast
 Magda Vášáryová as Maryška
 Jiří Schmitzer as Francin
 Jaromír Hanzlík as Pepin
 Rudolf Hrušínský (II) as Dr. Gruntorád
 Petr Čepek as Mr. de Giorgi (board member)
 Oldřich Vlach as Ruzicka
 František Řehák as Mr. Vejvoda
 Miloslav Štibich as Mr. Bernádek
 Alois Liškutín as Sefl
 Pavel Vondruška as Mr. Lustig
 Rudolf Hrušínský (III) as stable boy
 Miroslav Donutil as scrub
 Oldřich Vízner as Boda Cervinka

References

External links
 

1980 films
1980 comedy films
Czechoslovak comedy films
1980s Czech-language films
Films based on works by Bohumil Hrabal
Films directed by Jiří Menzel
Czech comedy films
1981 comedy films
1981 films
1980s Czech films